The 1973 UNLV Rebels football team was an American football team that represented the University of Nevada, Las Vegas as an independent during the 1973 NCAA Division II football season. In their first year under head coach Ron Meyer, the team compiled an 8–3 record, a significant improvement over the previous season (one victory).

The Rebels played eight games at Las Vegas Stadium; general admission tickets were $2.50, reserved seats were $4.50, and season tickets were thirty dollars.

Schedule

References

UNLV
UNLV Rebels football seasons
UNLV Rebels football